The American Evaluation Association (AEA) is a professional association for evaluators and those with a professional interest in the field of evaluation, including practitioners, faculty, students, funders, managers, and government decision-makers. , AEA has approximately 7057 members from all 50 US states and over 60 other countries.

Mission 
The American Evaluation Association's mission is to:
 Improve evaluation practices and methods
 Increase evaluation use
 Promote evaluation as a profession and
 Support the contribution of evaluation to the generation of theory and knowledge about effective human action.

Guiding Principles for Evaluators 
AEA Publishes the AEA: Guiding Principles for Evaluators, which set expectations for evaluators in the areas of: (a) systematic inquiry, (b) competence, (c) integrity/honesty, (d) respect for people, and (e) responsibilities for general and public welfare.

Publications 
AEA sponsors two journals. The American Journal of Evaluation is published quarterly through SAGE Publications and includes individually peer-reviewed articles on a range of topics in the field. New Directions for Evaluation is a peer-reviewed thematic sourcebook published quarterly through Jossey-Bass/Wiley, with each issue focusing on a different topic or aspect of evaluation.

Topical Interest Groups 
, AEA has 51 topically focused subgroups. Each subgroup develops a strand of content for the association's annual conference, and works to build a community of practice through various means.
 Advocacy and Policy Change
 Behavioral Health [formerly Alcohol, Drug Abuse, and Mental Health]
 Assessment in Higher Education
 Business, Leadership, and Performance
 Cluster, Multi-Site and Multi-Level Evaluation
 Collaborative, Participatory & Empowerment Evaluation
 College Access Programs
 Community Psychology
 Costs, Effectiveness, Benefits, and Economics
 Crime and Justice
 Data Visualization and Reporting
 Disabilities and Other Vulnerable Populations
 Disaster and Emergency Management Evaluation
 Distance Education and Other Educational Technologies
 Environmental Program Evaluation
 Evaluating the Arts and Culture
 Evaluation Managers and Supervisors
 Evaluation Policy
 Evaluation Use
 Extension Education Evaluation
 Feminist Issues in Evaluation
 Government Evaluation
 Graduate Student and New Evaluators
 Health Evaluation
 Human Services Evaluation
 Independent Consulting
 Indigenous Peoples in Evaluation
 Integrating Technology into Evaluation
 Internal Evaluation
 International and Cross-Cultural Evaluation
 Lesbian, Gay, Bisexual & Transgender Issues
 Mixed Methods in Evaluation
 Multiethnic Issues in Evaluation
 Needs Assessment
 Non-Profits and Foundations Evaluation
 Organizational Learning and Evaluation Capacity Building
 Prek-12 Educational Evaluation
 Program Theory and Theory Driven Evaluation
 Program Design
 Qualitative Methods
 Quantitative Methods: Theory and Design
 Research on Evaluation
 Research, Technology, and Development Evaluation
 Social Network Analysis
 Social Work
 Stem Evaluation
 Systems in Evaluation
 Teaching of Evaluation
 Theories of Evaluation
 Translational Research Evaluation
 Youth Focus Evaluation

History

Merger of ERS and ENet 
In 1986, the Evaluation Research Society and Evaluation Network merged to become the American Evaluation Association. The two associations had been conducting joint annual conferences for several years when ERS President Joseph Wholey contacted Evaluation Network President Michael Hendricks to suggest a formal merger of the two organizations.

References

External links 
 American Evaluation Association

Evaluation
Business organizations based in the United States